Gianna is a female Italian given name, a diminutive form of Giovanna. In English, it is translated as Joann, Joanne or Joanna. These names mean "God is gracious".  See also "John" for the origin.

Variations
Feminine: Giana, Gia, Giovanna
Masculine: Gianni, Giovanni

People
Gianna Angelopoulos-Daskalaki (born 1955), Greek businesswoman
Gianna Maria Canale (1927–2009), Italian actress
Gianna D'Angelo (1929–2013), American soprano
Gianna Galli (1935–2010), Italian soprano
Gianna Hablützel-Bürki (born 1969), Swiss fencer
Gianna Jessen (born 1977), American singer and anti-abortion activist
Gianna Jun (Jun Ji-hyun, born 1981), South Korean actress and model
Gianna Manzini (1896–1974), Italian writer
Gianna Beretta Molla (1922–1962), Italian pediatrician and Roman Catholic saint
Gianna Nannini (born 1954), Italian singer-songwriter
Gianna Pederzini (1900–1988), Italian mezzo-soprano
Gianna Rolandi (1952–2021), American soprano
Gianna Talone (born 1957), Italian-American pharmacist and writer
Giuseppina "Gianna" Tuissi (1923–1945), Italian resistance member

See also

Italian feminine given names